Lashkara() is a Pakistani drama serial that started airing on ARY Digital from 3 April 2018. It is written by Zafar Mairaj, directed by Kashif Nisar, and stars Ushna Shah, Mohsin Abbas Haider and Imran Ashraf.

It stars Ushna Shah and Imran Ashraf in their second on-screen appearance after Alif Allah Aur Insaan while Kinza Malik and Noorul Hassan in fourth on-screen appearance after Sammi, Alif Allah Aur Insaan, and Dar Si Jaati Hai Sila.

Cast
Ushna Shah as Bubly
Imran Ashraf as Sunny
Mohsin Abbas Haider as Feeka
Saba Hameed as Nasreen
Anam Tanveer as Kiran
Mehar Bano as Nikki
Saba Faisal as Kulsoom
Kinza Malik as Bubly's mother	
Noor-ul-Hassan
Rasheed Ali
Rizwan Riaz

Awards and nominations

References

External links
 

Pakistani drama television series
2018 Pakistani television series debuts
2018 Pakistani television series endings
Urdu-language television shows
ARY Digital original programming
Television series set in Punjab, Pakistan
Television shows set in Lahore